Fredrik Holster (born 10 March 1988 in Nyköping) is a Swedish footballer who last played for Nyköpings BIS.

Career
He has previously played for BK Häcken and FC Väsby United and GIF Sundsvall.

In August 2013 Holster signed for Azerbaijan Premier League side Ravan Baku. On 19 October 2013, Holster made his debut for Ravan Baku, coming on as a half time substitute for Miloš Adamović in their 2-1 defeat to Neftchi Baku. Holster left Ravan at the start of the winter break in December 2013, and went on to sign a two-year contract with Assyriska in March 2014.

Career statistics

References

External links

Guardian's Stats Centre
Eliteprospects Profile

1988 births
Living people
Swedish footballers
Sweden youth international footballers
Swedish expatriate footballers
Allsvenskan players
Superettan players
BK Häcken players
AFC Eskilstuna players
GIF Sundsvall players
Ravan Baku FC players
Assyriska FF players
Åtvidabergs FF players
Nyköpings BIS players
Expatriate footballers in Azerbaijan
Association football midfielders
Swedish expatriate sportspeople in Azerbaijan
People from Nyköping Municipality
Sportspeople from Södermanland County